Educational Launch of Nanosatellites (ELaNa) is an initiative created by NASA to attract and retain students in the science, technology, engineering and mathematics disciplines. The program is managed by the Launch Services Program (LSP) at NASA's Kennedy Space Center in Florida.

Overview 

The ELaNa initiative has made partnerships with universities in the US to design and launch small research satellites called CubeSats (because of their cube shape). These low-cost CubeSat missions provide NASA with valuable opportunities to test emerging technologies that may be useful in future space missions, while university students get to be involved in all phases of the mission, from instrument and satellite design, to launch and monitoring.

A CubeSat has a cubic shape measuring 10 × 10 × 10 cm (1 unit or 1U), and can be fabricated of multiple cubic units such as 2U, 3U and 6U, and weighing 1.33 kg per unit. Because of the high cost incurred by launching them to orbit, ELaNa's satellites are launched as secondary payload on other missions that have mass and space to spare. Since the launch waiting list has grown considerably, another initiative was launched in 2015 in partnership with the private industry to develop launch vehicles dedicated to CubeSats exclusively. A new company is called Rocket Lab and their launch vehicle is the Electron rocket. This agreement with NASA, enables the company to use NASA resources such as personnel, facilities and equipment for commercial launch efforts. In 2015, NASA contracted two other companies for this purpose: Firefly Space Systems and Virgin Galactic. Nevertheless, NASA CubeSats will continue to hitch rides as secondary payloads in larger rockets whenever possible.

As of August 2017, NASA's ELaNa initiative has selected 151 CubeSat missions, 49 of which have been launched into space.

Missions 
ELaNa mission numbers are based on the order they are manifested; due to the nature of launching, the actual launch order differs from the mission numbers.

Launched missions

Future missions 
List of future missions:

References

External links 

 ELaNa Home page at NASA
 Past ELaNa missions at NASA
 Upcoming ELaNa missions at NASA
 CubeSat Launch Initiative at NASA

CubeSats
NASA programs
NASA oversight
Nanosatellites